Sir Clement Edmondes (c. 1568–1622) was an English government official and  politician who sat in the House of Commons at various times between 1609 and 1622.

Background and education
Edmondes was son of Sir Thomas Edmondes of Shrawardine, Shropshire. His father was comptroller of Queen Elizabeth's Household. In 1585, he became a clerk or chorister at All Souls College, Oxford.  After graduation, he became a Fellow of All Souls in 1589.  He was later was living in a park at Castle Hedingham, and may therefore have been in the service of the Earl of Oxford or another of his family.  In 1600, he published Observations, upon the Five First Bookes of Caesar's Commentaries, followed the next year by a similar work on the Sixth and Seventh books.  This was dedicated to his 'honourable friend' Sir Francis Vere.  He was present at the battle of Nieuwpoort and referred in his works to the sieges of Ostend (1601–4) and Grave, in Brabant (1602).

Career
In 1601, Edmondes obtained the post of Assistant Remembrancer of the City of London, and succeeded as Remembrancer on the resignation of Dr Giles Fletcher, with a salary of £100.  In 1608, he was involved in the negotiations for a loan from the city to James I. He was appointed a Clerk of the Privy Council on 13 August 1609.  When he resigned as Remembrancer, the City gave him 40 angels to buy a cloak.

In November 1609 Edmondes was elected Member of Parliament for Carnarvon in a by-election. He was appointed Muster Master General in 1613.  In 1615 he was sent on a diplomatic mission to the Netherlands to investigate coordinating English and Dutch East India trade.  He then wrote a wide-ranging account of the country (unpublished). He was knighted on 29 September 1617.

In 1618, Edmondes was dispatched to the fens to report on the conflicts over draining them.  He spent time surveying the rivers and recommended that the Commissioners of Sewers should enforce their decrees and should begin by clearing the outfalls of the rivers River Nene and River Welland.

In 1621 Edmondes was elected Member of Parliament for Oxford University, but took little part in the debates.  He was appointed a Secretary of State, but died (of apoplexy) before taking office.  He was buried at Preston Deanery, near Northampton, where he had acquired the manor in 1620.

Family
Edmondes  married Mary Clerk, daughter of Robert Clerk of Grafton, Northamptonshire in 1598. She was an attendant upon Lady Stafford.

References

Stephen Porter, ‘Edmondes, Sir Clement (1567/8?–1622)’, Oxford Dictionary of National Biography, Oxford University Press, Sept 2004; online edn, May 2008 , accessed 24 Dec 2009.
Alexander Marr, "Curious and Useful Buildings: The Mathematical Model of Sir Clement Edmondes", Bodleian Library Record, vol. 18, no. 2 (2004), pp. 108–150

1568 births
1622 deaths
Fellows of All Souls College, Oxford
English civil servants
Clerks of the Privy Council
Members of the pre-1707 Parliament of England for the University of Oxford
Politicians from Shropshire
People from West Northamptonshire District
Alumni of All Souls College, Oxford
16th-century English writers
English MPs 1604–1611
English MPs 1621–1622
Members of the Parliament of England (pre-1707) for constituencies in Wales
Members of Parliament for Caernarfon